Seung-jun, also spelled Seung-joon, or Sung-jun, Sung-joon, is a Korean masculine given name. Its meaning differs based on the hanja used to write each syllable of the name. There are 17 hanja with the reading "seung" and 43 hanja with the reading "joon" on the South Korean government's official list of hanja which may be used in given names.

People
People with this name include:

Entertainers
Kim Seung-jun (born 1967), South Korean voice actor
Lee Seung-joon (actor, born 1973), South Korean actor
Lee Seung-joon (actor, born 1978), South Korean actor
Yoo Seung-jun (born 1976), South Korean singer

Sportspeople
Lee Seung-jun (basketball) (born 1978), American-born South Korean basketball player
Song Seung-jun (born 1980), South Korean baseball player
Son Seung-joon (born 1982), South Korean football defender (K-League Classic)
Kim Seung-jun (footballer) (born 1994), South Korean football forward (K-League Classic)
Ha Seung-joon (born 1998), South Korean football defender (Belgian First Division B)

See also
List of Korean given names

References

Korean masculine given names